David George Arkin (December 24, 1941 – January 14, 1991) was an American actor, known for his numerous supporting appearances in the films of Robert Altman. These roles were part of Altman's frequent ensemble and included Staff Sergeant Vollmer in M*A*S*H (where he also wrote and voiced the PA announcements), Harry in The Long Goodbye (1973), Norman in Nashville (1975), and The Mailman/The Police Officer in Popeye (1980).

Early life and education

Arkin was born in Los Angeles, California.  He graduated from University High School and later UCLA with a major in Theater Arts.

Career
Arkin had an "introducing" credit in I Love You, Alice B. Toklas (1968) and brief appearances in Valley of the Dolls (1967), All the President's Men (1976), and Cannonball (1976).

His television credits include Hawaii Five-O, Whitney and the Robot, and a season-long appearance as the character Gabriel Kaye in the CBS television series Storefront Lawyers, co-starring Robert Foxworth and Sheila Larken.  He also appeared on The Tonight Show Starring Johnny Carson and on the Joey Bishop and the Steve Allen late night shows with the Hollywood Sunset Strip improvisational comedy troupe The Session (which included Richard Dreyfuss, Rob Reiner, Larry Bishop, Bobbie Shaw-Chance, Marj Dusay, and Phil Mishkin); he later performed with The Second City touring troupe. 
 
Arkin wrote Human Cargo: Great Escapes, which his wife Anne E. Curry later produced with their company Old Dime Box Productions for the Showtime television network as Escape: Human Cargo; it starred Treat Williams and was filmed in Israel.  She also produced and directed One Man's Opinion, a politically incorrect take on newly released films; it starred Arkin and Professor Tyrone Shaw, now on the faculty of journalism at Johnson State College in Vermont.

Personal life and death
Arkin was married three times, the last time to actress Anne E. Curry at the time of his death in 1991.

David Arkin was not related either to the actor Alan Arkin or Alan's son Adam Arkin (also an actor).  Alan's father was David I. Arkin.

Arkin was known among his friends and colleagues for having introduced his friend Arnold Schwarzenegger (then Arnold Strong) to Altman, at the time The Long Goodbye was being cast.  This began Schwarzenegger's career in film.

On January 14, 1991, he died by suicide in Los Angeles, California at the age of 49.

Filmography

Notes

External links

1941 births
20th-century American male actors
American male film actors
American male television actors
Male actors from Los Angeles
People from Silver Lake, Los Angeles
Suicides in California
1991 suicides